392nd or 392d may refer to:

392d Bombardment Group, provisional United States Air Force unit assigned to Air Combat Command to activate or inactivate as needed
392d Bombardment Squadron or 92d Air Refueling Squadron, squadron of the 92d Air Refueling Wing's 92d Operations Group
392d Fighter Squadron or 178th Reconnaissance Squadron, unit of the North Dakota Air National Guard 119th Wing
392d Training Squadron (392 TRS), intercontinental ballistic missile (ICBM) training unit at Vandenberg AFB, California
392nd (Croatian) Infantry Division (Wehrmacht), a so-called "legionnaire" division of the German Army during World War II
MS Peniarth 392D (Hengwrt Chaucer manuscript), an early-15th-century manuscript of the Canterbury Tales, held in the National Library of Wales in Aberystwyth

See also
392 (number)
392, the year 392 (CCCXCII) of the Julian calendar
392 BC